Rodrigo Fernández (born 8 February 1996) is a Chilean rugby union player, currently playing for Súper Liga Americana de Rugby side Selknam. His preferred position is fullback.

Professional career
Fernández signed for Súper Liga Americana de Rugby side Selknam ahead of the 2021 Súper Liga Americana de Rugby season. He had previously played for both the Chile national side and the Chile Sevens side.

References

External links

1996 births
Living people
Chilean rugby union players
Rugby union fullbacks
Selknam (rugby union) players
Chile international rugby union players
21st-century Chilean people